Parodontax is a brand name of toothpaste and mouthwash currently owned by Haleon, previously GSK.

History
Parodontax toothpaste was developed in 1937 by German dentist Dr. Focke. The product was originally based on sodium bicarbonate. Consequently it was obtained by German pharmaceutical company Madaus which specialised in herbal medicine and which added components that were specifically anti-inflammatory and antibacterial, including extracts of several medicinal plants. 

The historic ingredients of the toothpaste contained the following elements: sodium bicarbonate, water, glycerin, cocamidopropyl betaine, alcohol, rhatany (Krameria triandra) root extract, Echinacea (Echinacea purpurea) flower/leaf/stem extract, denatured alcohol, xanthan gum, chamomile (Chamomilla recutita) extract, mhyrr (Commiphora myrrha) extract, sodium saccharin, sodium benzoate,  sage (Salvia officinalis) oil,  wild mint (Mentha arvensis) oil, limonene, and iron oxide. These herbal extracts gave the toothpaste a particular salty taste.

In 1975, Parodontax launched the first product containing chlorhexidine digluconate in Germany. Since 1989, the active substance chlorhexidine digluconate has been widely used in the treatment of gum disease. Over the years, a wide range of pharmaceutical products, including mouthwashes, sprays and gels, have been developed to provide effective short-term treatment for gingivitis.

In 2001, by GlaxoSmithKline which continued the production according to the old recipe. However, in 2017  the herbal extracts were removed leaving the toothpaste with the active ingredient stannous fluoride and the abrasive ingredient sodium bicarbonate. Nevertheless, the producers claim that the paste still has the ability to heal bleeding gums, which is debated by dentist associations.

See also

List of toothpaste brands
Index of oral health and dental articles

References

Brands of toothpaste
Haleon
Products introduced in 1937
2001 mergers and acquisitions